Bartlett is an unincorporated community in Isle of Wight County, Virginia, United States. It is located at the junction of U.S. Route 17, U.S. Route 258, and State Route 32, on the James River Bridge approach southeast of Smithfield.

References

Unincorporated communities in Isle of Wight County, Virginia
Unincorporated communities in Virginia